A Bag Full of Soul is an album by American jazz organist Jimmy McGriff featuring performances recorded in 1966 and originally released on the Solid State label.

Reception
The AllMusic review by Michael Erlewine simply stated "McGriff with funk guitarist Thornell Schwartz".

Track listing
All compositions by Jimmy McGriff except as indicated
 "I Cover the Waterfront" (Edward Eliscu, Johnny Green) - 5:00
 "D.B. Blues (Part I)" - 6:18
 "D.B. Blues (Part II)" - 5:05
 "See See Rider" (Ma Rainey) - 4:17
 "Red River Blues" - 3:26
 "Hallelujah" - 2:33
 "Boston Bust Out" - 3:14
 "On the Way Home" - 3:29

Personnel
Jimmy McGriff - organ
Thornel Schwartz - guitar 
Willie Jenkins - drums

References

Solid State Records (jazz label) albums
Jimmy McGriff albums
1966 albums
Albums produced by Sonny Lester